The Blankinship Motor Company Building is a historic auto dealership building at 120 East Cypress Street in Warren, Arkansas.  Its construction in 1940 was heralded as part of an "era of progress", as the Art Moderne building supplanted a horse barn on the site.  The building was designed by H. Ray Burke, whose other commissions included the Lonoke County Courthouse and the Drew County Courthouse.  The building was used as a Ford and Lincoln dealership and service station until 1965, when the dealership closed.  It continued to operate as a service center until 1982, after which it has had a succession of other uses.

The building was listed on the National Register of Historic Places in 2001.

See also
National Register of Historic Places listings in Bradley County, Arkansas

References

Auto dealerships on the National Register of Historic Places
Ford Motor Company
Commercial buildings on the National Register of Historic Places in Arkansas
Streamline Moderne architecture in the United States
Commercial buildings completed in 1940
National Register of Historic Places in Bradley County, Arkansas
Transportation buildings and structures on the National Register of Historic Places in Arkansas
Historic district contributing properties in Arkansas
Transportation in Bradley County, Arkansas
1940 establishments in Arkansas
Individually listed contributing properties to historic districts on the National Register in Arkansas
Warren, Arkansas